The 2014–15 Vanderbilt Commodores men's basketball team represented Vanderbilt University in the 2014–15 NCAA Division I men's basketball season. The team's head coach was Kevin Stallings, in his sixteenth season at Vanderbilt. The team played their home games at Memorial Gymnasium in Nashville, Tennessee, as a member of the Southeastern Conference. They finished the season 21–14, 9–9 in SEC play to finish in seventh place. They lost in the second round of the SEC tournament where they lost to Tennessee. They were invited to the National Invitation Tournament where they defeated Saint Mary's in the first round and South Dakota State in the second round before losing in the quarterfinals to Stanford.

Previous season 
Coach Kevin Stallings completed his fifteenth season by posting a 15–16 record during the 2013-14 season, where the Commodores finished tenth in the SEC. The Commodores lost to Mississippi State in the 1st round of the SEC tournament.

Departures

Incoming transfers

Class of 2014 signees

Roster

Schedule

|-
!colspan=9 style="background:#000000; color:#BDAE79;"| Exhibition

|-
!colspan=9 style="background:#000000; color:#BDAE79;"| Non-Conference Regular Season

|-
!colspan=9 style="background:#000000; color:#BDAE79;"| SEC Conference Season

|-
!colspan=9 style="background:#000000; color:#BDAE79;"| SEC tournament

|-
!colspan=9 style="background:#000000; color:#BDAE79;"| NIT

See also
2014–15 Vanderbilt Commodores women's basketball team

References

Vanderbilt Commodores men's basketball seasons
Vanderbilt
Vanderbilt
Vanderbilt Commodores men's basketball
Vanderbilt Commodores men's basketball